Carl Jack Miller is an author, speaker and researcher at Demos, a think tank based in London, where he co-founded the Centre for the Analysis of Social Media (CASM) in 2012.  Miller is also a visiting scholar and research fellow at King's College, London.

Miller's book, The Death of the Gods: The New Global Power Grab (2018), analyses power in the digital age. His work has also been published and featured in Wired, UnHerd, New Scientist, The Sunday Times, The Daily Telegraph, HuffPost, BBC News, Sky News, the Irish Examiner, The Economist, the Financial Times, The Guardian, and the New Statesman. He is the joint winner of the Transmission Prize 2019 with his fellow researcher Jamie Bartlett.

Education
Miller studied history at the University of Cambridge, graduating in 2008, and war studies at King's College London where he was awarded a Master of Arts (MA) degree in 2009.

Career and research
Miller's research investigates the pitfalls and promises of the digital age. His interests include politics and technology, cybercrime, war, journalism, the rise of the hackers, the threat of hate speech, the effects of automation and how social and political power is changing.

With David Omand and Jamie Bartlett, Miller coined the term social media intelligence (SOCMINT) in 2012. With Bartlett, Miller is a co-author of Truth, Lies and the Internet, a report on young people's critical thinking online, and The Power of Unreason, an investigation of conspiracy theories, extremism and counter-terrorism.

 Miller serves as an expert advisor on social media for the Care Quality Commission (CQC), the external social media expert for the Civil Contingencies Secretariat (CCS) of the Government of the United Kingdom, a member of the Independent Digital Ethics Panel for Policing (IDEPP), and an external advisor on the cross-governmental review on the use of data science within the public sector. Miller is a regular keynote speaker at conferences and has spoken at events and venues such as TEDx in Athens, Thinking Digital, and the Alan Turing Institute in London.

The Death of the Gods
Miller is the author of the book The Death of the Gods: The New Global Power Grab which analyses power in the digital age. First published in 2018, the book tells the stories of people working in media, technology, warfare, business, politics and crime. Their stories illustrate how technology, particularly the internet and social media, is reshaping power. Miller describes his meetings with:
 a fake news/clickbait merchant in Kosovo
 the Hikikomori in South Korea
 delegates and cypherpunks at the annual DEF CON conference in Las Vegas
 employees of Facebook and Google in Silicon Valley
 soldiers of the 77th Brigade in the British Army working in information warfare and psychological warfare.
 members of the Defence and Security Media Advisory Committee (DSMA)
 founders of the Tech Model Railroad Club (TMRC) at the Massachusetts Institute of Technology (MIT)
As well as these vignettes, the book includes discussions of the work of Audrey Tang also Eliot Higgins of Bellingcat which illustrate the changing nature of power in the 21st century, from both a dystopian and utopian viewpoint.

References

Living people
British journalists
Alumni of King's College London
Place of birth missing (living people)
Year of birth missing (living people)
Alumni of Homerton College, Cambridge